CRFC may refer to:

 Cardiff RFC
 Carrick Rangers F.C.
 Cambuslang Rangers F.C.
 Carluke Rovers F.C.
 Cobh Ramblers F.C.
 Community Radio Fund of Canada
 Consolidated Revenue Fund of Canada
 Corrib Rangers F.C.
 Cove Rangers F.C.